Swæfberht was a King of Kent, reigning jointly with Oswine, and possibly also Swæfheard. Swæfberht issued an undated charter that was witnessed by Oswine , and is probably the Gabertus who witnessed a charter issued by Oswine in July 689 . He is usually combined with Swæfheard because of their similar names and overlapping dates, but multiple kingship was commonplace in Anglo-Saxon England, especially in Essex, where Swæfheard originated.

See also
List of monarchs of Kent

External links
 

Kentish monarchs
7th-century English monarchs